The Bull Mountains,  el. , are a mountain range of the Rocky Mountains located in Yellowstone and Musselshell Counties in the U.S. state of Montana, lying northeast of Billings and south of Roundup.They are a lower elevation mountain range compared to other ranges in the same geographic region. Vegetation consists primarily of grassy meadows, tracts of sagebrush, and ponderosa pine forests, with the western half of the range being slightly more forested than the eastern half of the range. While the Bull Mountains are decent habitat for mule deer, Merriam's turkeys, bobcats, mountain lions, and elk, hunting and other recreational activities are limited unless an outfitter is hired, as there is little public land in the range.

See also
 List of mountain ranges in Montana

Notes

Mountain ranges of Montana
Landforms of Musselshell County, Montana
Landforms of Yellowstone County, Montana